Coney Hatch is a Canadian hard rock band who released three albums in the 1980s and released their fourth album Four in 2013. Based in Toronto, Ontario, Canada, the band consisted of lead vocalist and guitarist Carl Dixon, vocalist and bassist Andy Curran, guitarist Steve Shelski and drummer Dave 'Thumper' Ketchum. The band was known for its loud live shows. In 2018, the band toured eight shows across Canada and played Germany's H.E.A.T. festival with Sean Kelly on lead guitar.

History
Coney Hatch formed in 1981, and began performing and developing original material. The band was named after the Colney Hatch Lunatic Asylum (1851–1993) in London.

The band's first album was produced by Kim Mitchell of Max Webster and released in 1982.  Ketchum left the band in 1983, and was replaced by Barry Connors, who formerly drummed with the band Toronto.

In 1983 Coney Hatch opened for Iron Maiden at forty concerts on their World Piece Tour.

The band performed at the Hollywood Palladium in 1985 with Rough Cutt and Accept.

In April, 2008, Carl Dixon was very seriously injured in a car accident in Australia, leaving him with traumatic brain injury and extensive titanium implants and a glass eye. On August 5, 2010, the original Coney Hatch line up including the injured Carl Dixon played a reunion show at the Phoenix Concert Theatre in Toronto. It was the first performance from the original line up since 1993. Two days later they played in Hamilton, Ontario at The Festival of Friends. They were the second to last act on the main stage. The final act of the night was Gord Downie.

A further live date was scheduled for the Firefest rock festival in Nottingham, England on 23 October 2011. Coney Hatch performed at the Rock n' Roar weekend event in August, 2013 in Spanish, Ontario. Coney Hatch again featured at Firefest, Nottingham in October 2014. In 2018, Coney Hatch announced an eight dates tour from October to December, with Sean Kelly on lead guitar in place of Steve Shelski. Coney Hatch toured to packed venues with Steve Harris's British Lion in Ontario and Quebec. and went on to favourable reviews playing H.E.A.T. Festival Ludwigburg, Germany.

Members' other activities
Dixon later played with April Wine and was lead singer of Guess Who for eight years in total, until his near-fatal car accident in 2008 in Australia. Coney Hatch bandmate, Curran spoke to Dixon via phone while Dixon was still in his coma, and told him Dixon had to live because Coney Hatch had more rocking to do. Dixon survived with multiple injuries and years in rehab. He tours solo and performs with his band and with former members of The Guess Who. He has released five solo albums. In 2016 he returned to The Guess Who for two sold-out shows in the USA. In 2017 Dixon released his debut country album "Whole 'Nother Thing". Dixon's survival from the automobile accident saw him become an inspirational speaker. He is listed with Canada's National Speaker's Bureau. In 2015 his first book was published by Dundurn Press titled A Strange Way to Live, and includes, among other things, his experience playing as part of Coney Hatch. Dixon has written instrumentals for television series including Tornado Hunters (Netflix), his songs have featured on Degrassi High, Baywatch (Taste of Love co-written with Brett Walker) and The Saddle Club television series.

Curran also released a solo album and two hit singles, was nominated for two Juno Awards and awarded one for "Most Promising Vocalist" in 1991.

Membership
Current members are:
Carl Dixon
Andy Curran
Dave Ketchum
Sean Kelly

Former members:
Paul Van Remortel
Eddy Godlewski
Kevin (James) LaBrie
Paul Marangoni
Phil Naro
Barry Connors
Steve Shelski

Discography

Albums
 Coney Hatch (1982), released internationally by Mercury-PolyGram Records and Casablanca Records (Japan)
 Outa Hand (1983)
 Friction (1985)
 Best of Three (1992)
 Four (2013)

Singles
 1982: "Devil's Deck" [music video]
 1982: "Hey Operator" (#19 Canada)
 1982: "Monkey Bars"
 1983: "Don't Say Make Me"
 1983: "First Time For Everything" [music video]
 1983: "Shake It" [music video]
 1985: "Fantasy" [music video]
 1985: "Girl From Last Night's Dream"
 1985: "She's Gone"
 1985: "This Ain't Love"

References

External links
 Coney Hatch (Official band site)
 Carl Dixon
 CanConRox entry
 Barry Connors

Anthem Records artists
Canadian heavy metal musical groups
Musical groups established in 1982
Musical groups from Toronto
1982 establishments in Ontario